Larsen Inlet is an inlet,  long in a north–south direction and  wide, between Cape Longing and Cape Sobral along the east coast of Graham Land, Antarctica. Carl Anton Larsen, a Norwegian whaling captain, reported a large bay in this area in 1893, and Larsen's name was suggested for the feature by Edwin Swift Balch in 1902. The inlet was re-identified and charted by the Falkland Islands Dependencies Survey in 1947. It was ice-filled in 1986 then mostly ice-free in 1988. Mount Brading lies 4 nautical miles (7 km) east of the northeast corner of Larsen Inlet.

References

Inlets of Graham Land
Nordenskjöld Coast